Haugjegla Lighthouse (also spelled: Hauggjegla) is a coastal lighthouse located in Smøla Municipality in Møre og Romsdal county, Norway. The lighthouse is only accessible by boat. The lighthouse is listed as a protected site.

History
The first light was set up in 1905, the present tower was built in 1922, and the station was automated in 1988. The  round, cylindrical, cast-iron tower is painted red with a white stripe around it. The concrete base is painted white. The light at the top emits a white, red, or green light (depending on direction) occulting twice every 8 seconds.

It is now possible to rent Haugjegla Lighthouse (Fyr) for a holiday in the spring and summer season, from May to September, for up to 10 persons. This is today a very popular place and regarded as one of the most spectacular holidays in Scandinavia, often in combination with eagle watching, fishing and a visit to the old fisher village Veiholmen.

See also

Lighthouses in Norway
List of lighthouses in Norway

References

External links 

 Veiholmen Fyr Homepage
 Havkroa, Haugjegla Lighthouse is administered by Havkroa
 Norsk Fyrhistorisk Forening 

Lighthouses completed in 1922
Lighthouses in Møre og Romsdal
Smøla
Listed lighthouses in Norway